Erika Pluhar is an actress, singer and author from Austria and was born on 28 February 1939 in Vienna.

Erika Pluhar is the daughter of Anna and Dr Josef Pluhar. One of her sisters, Ingeborg G. Pluhar, is a painter and sculptor.

After finishing school in 1957, Erika Pluhar studied at the Max Reinhardt Seminar, the Viennese academy for music and the performing arts where she graduated with distinction in 1959. She immediately went into acting at the Burgtheater, the imperial court theatre, where she was a member of the acting troupe from 1959 until 1999.

At the beginning of the 1970s Erika Pluhar embarked on a singing career. She has been writing books since her childhood; her first book was published in 1981.

Erika Pluhar has been married twice (with Udo Proksch, businessman and convict of the murder of six people, and André Heller, poet and all-rounder artist) and has had a daughter, Anna (1961–1999).

Literary works (German) 
 Aus Tagebüchern (1981)
 Über Leben : Lieder und ihre Geschichten (1982)
 Lieder (1986)
 Als gehörte eins zum anderen : eine Geschichte (1991)
 Zwischen die Horizonte geschrieben : Lieder, Lyrik, kleine Prosa (1992)
 Marisa : Rückblenden auf eine Freundschaft (1996), Hoffmann und Campe, 
 Am Ende des Gartens : Erinnerungen an eine Jugend (1997)
 Matildas Erfindungen (1999)
 Der Fisch lernt fliegen : unterwegs durch die Jahre (2000)
 Verzeihen Sie, ist das hier schon die Endstation? (2001)
 Die Wahl (2003)
 Erika Pluhar: Ein Bilderbuch (2004)
 Die stille Zeit : Geschichten und Gedanken nicht nur zu Weihnachten (2004)
 Reich der Verluste (2005)
 Paar Weise. Geschichten und Betrachtungen zur Zweisamkeit, (Januar 2007), Residenz/Niederösterreichisches Pressehaus,

Records 
 Erika Pluhar singt (1972)
 So oder so ist das Leben (1974)
 Die Liebeslieder der Erika Pluhar (1975)
 Hier bin ich (1976)
 Beziehungen (1978)
  (1979)
 Narben (1981)
 Über Leben (1982)
 Liebende (1983)
 Wiener Lieder
 Bossa à la Marinoff (1989)
 For ever
 Ein Abend am Naschmarkt (1995)
 Jahraus, jahrein (1998)
 I geb net auf (1999)
 Lieder vom Himmel und der Erde (2002)
 Es war einmal (2004)
 Wien. Lied. Wir. (2006)

Film appearances (in German) 
 1961: Die Türen knallen (TV film)
 1963: Die Möwe (TV film)
 1964: Das vierte Gebot (TV film)
 1968:  (TV film)
 1968: Moss on the Stones, directed by Georg Lhotzky
 1968: Die Bürger von Calais (TV film)
 1969: Schwester Bonaventura (TV film)
 1969: Traumnovelle (TV film)
 1970: Hier bin ich, mein Vater (TV film)
 1970: , directed by Alfred Vohrer
 1970:  (TV film)
 1971: The Goalkeeper's Fear of the Penalty, directed by Wim Wenders – based on a story by Peter Handke
 1971: Die Nacht von Lissabon (TV film)
 1972: Monsieur Chasse (TV film)
 1973: Der Zuschlag (TV film)
 1973: 
 1974: Der Schwierige (TV film)
 1975:  (TV miniseries)
 1976: , directed by Wolf Gremm
 1977: Gaslicht (TV film)
 1977: , directed by Wolf Gremm
 1977: Just a Gigolo, directed by David Hemmings
 1978: Die Kameliendame (TV film)
 1978: The Man in the Rushes, directed by Manfred Purzer
 1980: Sunday Children, directed by Michael Verhoeven
 1983: , directed by 
 1986: Mamortische, directed by Antonio Victor D’Almeida
 1992: Rosalinas Haus
 1994: Etwas am Herzen
 1994: Mrs. Klein (TV film), directed by 
 1994: Rosen aus Jerichow, directed by Hans Peter Heinzl
 2001: Marafona: ein Film über das Lieben, directed by Erika Pluhar
 2010: The End Is My Beginning

Awards 
 The Josef Kainz Medal  from the City of Vienna (1979)
 The Robert Musil Medal from the city of Klagenfurt and the Robert Musil Archive (1984)
 Chamber Actress of the Year (1986)
 Honorary Medal of the City of Vienna, Gold (2000)

References

External links 

 Official website

1939 births
Living people
Austrian stage actresses
Austrian film actresses
Austrian television actresses
20th-century Austrian actresses
Actresses from Vienna
Austrian women writers